Maumee is a city in Lucas County, Ohio, United States. Located along the Maumee River, it is about 10 miles southwest of Toledo. The population was 14,286 at the 2010 census. Maumee was declared an All-America City by the National Civic League in June 2006.

Geography
Maumee is located at  (41.570545, -83.652503). It is about 11 miles upriver of Toledo, which is at the mouth of the Maumee River on Maumee Bay. This is a roughly triangle-shaped city. Its borders are formed by Interstate 80/90 to the north, to the west by Interstate 475/U.S. Route 23, and to the southeast by the Maumee River. It is just downriver from Waterville.

History

In pre-colonial times, Native Americans (notably the Ottawa) began using the rich resources at the present site of Maumee, Ohio, in the Maumee River valley. Throughout much of the eighteenth century, French, British and American forces struggled for control of the lower Maumee River as a major transportation artery linking East and West through Lake Erie.

Following the American Revolutionary War, Native Americans of the region, including the Odawa, Ojibwe and Potawatomie, and Shawnee, made alliances in what became called the Northwest Territory by the United States, which claimed it from the British after gaining independence. The Northwest Indian War was a series of conflicts from 1785 through 1795 between these nations and the US; it ended with a decisive American victory over the British and their Native American allies at the Battle of Fallen Timbers at Maumee in 1794. Maumee is the site of Gen. "Mad" Anthony Wayne's final fort, Fort Deposit, built in Aug. 1794 on his way to the battle of Fallen Timbers. Together with the conclusion of the War of 1812, which preserved most US territory, the end of warfare and defeat of the Native Americans opened the way for American expansion in present-day Ohio. Promoters arrived who were eager to make a fortune in selling and developing western lands.

In 1817 a town plat was laid out at the Foot of the Rapids of the Maumee River, and within a decade, the settlement was gaining recognition as a major trans-shipment point connecting Lake Erie and the land to the west. The opening of the Erie Canal in 1825 in New York State stimulated migration to Ohio, as it connected Great Lakes communities to the Hudson River and port of New York City. Completion of the Wabash and Erie Canal in 1840 further stimulated the economy. Jessup Scott, a noted town promoter, predicted that Maumee would become the "great city of the West," surpassing all rivals. By mid-century Maumee was a flourishing center of river trade, commerce and shipbuilding. Nearly twenty mercantile companies crowded the three miles (5 km) of ship docks and competed for the retail and wholesale trade.

In 1840 Maumee was designated as the county seat; lawyers came from miles around to practice in the imposing Greek Revival Lucas County Courthouse erected by private subscription. Court days were a time of trade and commerce, as well. The federal custom house and post office also were located in Maumee.

Dreams of greatness began to fade in the 1850s, when ships too large to navigate the river were introduced for use in the Great Lakes. In addition, the railroad provided faster and cheaper means of transportation than river traffic and drew off business. As the population expanded westward, Maumee lost the county seat in 1854.

Nearly a century later, in the 1970s, Maumee developed an economic renaissance. Today the city is one of the largest business centers in Northwest Ohio. Together, Arrowhead Business Park and Maumee's historic business community contribute to the 30,000 plus jobs in the community. Maumee has expanded its original boundaries, and the population has grown to more than 13,700 residents. Maumee's neighborhoods retain their small town flavor; in addition, many historic homes and buildings of the early residents still stand along the tree-lined streets of the architectural districts.

Demographics

2010 census
As of the census of 2010, there were 14,286 people, 6,037 households, and 3,854 families living in the city. The racial makeup of the city was 94.7% White, 1.8% African American, 0.2% Native American, 0.9% Asian, 0.7% from other races, and 1.7% from two or more races. Hispanic or Latino of any race were 3.4% of the population.

There were 6,037 households, of which 30.0% had children under the age of 18 living with them, 49.2% were married couples living together, 10.7% had a female householder with no husband present, 4.0% had a male householder with no wife present, and 36.2% were non-families. 30.5% of all households were made up of individuals, and 10.6% had someone living alone who was 65 years of age or older. The average household size was 2.37 and the average family size was 2.98.

The median age in the city was 39.7 years. 22.6% of residents were under the age of 18; 8.5% were between the ages of 18 and 24; 25.8% were from 25 to 44; 29.5% were from 45 to 64; and 13.7% were 65 years of age or older. The gender makeup of the city was 49.0% male and 51.0% female.

2000 census
As of the census of 2000, there were 15,237 people, 6,340 households, and 4,209 families living in the city. The population density was 1,533.6 people per square mile (591.9/km2). There were 6,613 housing units at an average density of 665.6 per square mile (256.9/km2). The racial makeup of the city was 96.61% White, 1.05% African American, 0.05% Native American, 0.72% Asian, 0.03% Pacific Islander, 0.58% from other races, and 0.96% from two or more races. Hispanic or Latino of any race were 1.82% of the population.

There were 6,340 households, out of which 30.4% had children under the age of 18 living with them, 54.4% were married couples living together, 9.4% had a female householder with no husband present, and 33.6% were non-families. 29.4% of all households were made up of individuals, and 9.8% had someone living alone who was 65 years of age or older. The average household size was 2.40 and the average family size was 3.00.

In the city the population was spread out, with 24.5% under the age of 18, 7.7% from 18 to 24, 29.8% from 25 to 44, 25.0% from 45 to 64, and 12.9% who were 65 years of age or older. The median age was 38 years. For every 100 females, there were 93.0 males. For every 100 females age 18 and over, there were 88.7 males.

The median income for a household in the city was $47,768, and the median income for a family was $60,776. Males had a median income of $41,281 versus $30,273 for females. The per capita income for the city was $23,805. About 3.0% of families and 4.3% of the population were below the poverty line, including 4.9% of those under age 18 and 5.9% of those age 65 or over.

Education
Maumee's public education system is run by the Maumee City School District, which received an "Effective" rating from the state of Ohio for the 2008–09 school year, the third highest of six possible ratings. This school district is the oldest chartered district in the state of Ohio. The school district is broken into four different categories: Elementary (K–3), which include Fairfield and Fort Miami Elementaries. The next level is Wayne Trail, which includes all students in the district in grades 4–5. Next, Gateway Middle School, includes all students in the district in grades 6–8. There is only one high school in Maumee, Maumee High School (Ohio), which serves grades 9–12.

There are also several private elementary and high schools in the area, including Maumee Valley Country Day School (South Toledo), St. John's Jesuit High School (South Toledo), Toledo Christian Schools (South Toledo), St. Joseph Catholic School & Preparatory (Maumee), and St. Patrick of Heatherdowns School (South Toledo).

Maumee has a public library, a branch of the Toledo-Lucas County Public Library.

Economy

Top employers
According to the city's 2017 Comprehensive Annual Financial Report, the top employers in the city are:

Notable people

 Theodore Dreiser, author of Sister Carrie and An American Tragedy
Betty Ford, former first lady of the United States
 James W. Forsyth, U.S. Army general
 Richard Kazmaier, 1951 Heisman Trophy winner; donated his Heisman Trophy to Maumee High School
 
 Robert Knepper, actor, played Theodore "T-Bag" Bagwell in Prison Break
 Edward Lamb, businessman, broadcasting executive, and labor lawyer
 Henry Ware Lawton, U.S. Army officer who served in the Civil War, Apache Wars, Spanish–American War
 Necros, one of the earliest hardcore punk bands
 Larry Nuber, auto racing announcer on ESPN
 Dane Sanzenbacher, wide receiver for the Cincinnati Bengals of the NFL
 Soledad Brothers, a punk blues trio
 Morrison Remick Waite, Chief Justice of the United States, 1874–1888
 Harold Anderson, founder of The Andersons

References

External links

Official Website
Maumee, Ohio information from Toledo.com
Maumee Valley Heritage Corridor

Cities in Lucas County, Ohio
Cities in Ohio